Granovka is a rural locality (a selo) and the administrative center of Grano-Mayakovsky Selsoviet of Romanovsky District, Altai Krai, Russia. The population was 371 in 2016. There are two streets.

Geography 
Granovka is located 39 km southwest of Romanovo (the district's administrative centre) by road. Selivyorstovo is the nearest rural locality.

References 

Rural localities in Romanovsky District, Altai Krai